The 2019–20 Portland State Vikings men's basketball team represent Portland State University in the 2019–20 NCAA Division I men's basketball season. The Vikings, led by 3rd-year head coach Barret Peery, play their home games at Viking Pavilion in Portland, Oregon, as members of the Big Sky Conference.

Previous season
The Vikings finished the 2018–19 season 16–16 overall, 11–9 in Big Sky play to finish in a three-way tie for 4th place. In the Big Sky Conference tournament, they lost to Weber State in the quarterfinals.

Roster

Schedule and results

|-
!colspan=12 style=| Exhibition

|-
!colspan=12 style=| Non-conference regular season

|-
!colspan=12 style=| Big Sky regular season

|-
!colspan=12 style=| Big Sky tournament
|-

|-

Source

References

Portland State Vikings men's basketball seasons
Portland State Vikings
Portland State Vikings men's basketball
Portland State Vikings men's basketball